By Right of Purchase is a 1918 American silent drama film starring Norma Talmadge in a story produced by her husband Joseph Schenck. The film was distributed by Lewis J. Selznick's Select Pictures company. An up-and-coming actress and soon to be gossip columnist Hedda Hopper has a small role in this picture.

Plot
As described in a film magazine, against the promptings of her heart, Margot Hughes (Talmadge) marries Chadwick Himes (O'Brien) and completely ignores the fact that her husband is very much in love with her. As a result, Chadwick comes to believe that it is impossible to win the love of his wife, and becomes cold towards her just as her love for him begins to awaken. There is a decided breach between them and when Margot takes up with Dick Derwent (Courtleigh), even though her husband forbids it, they break altogether. Through a friend Chadwick learns that his wife loves him. He goes to their home to beg for her forgiveness only to find it empty. He goes to his yacht for seclusion only to find Margot there, and they have a happy reunion.

Cast
 Norma Talmadge as Margot Hughes
 Eugene O'Brien as Chadwick Himes
 Ida Darling as Mrs. Hughes
 William Courtleigh, Jr. as Dick Derwent
 Charles Wellesley as Donald Nugent
 Florence B. Billings as Madge Sears
 Hedda Hopper as Woman of society, on the phone (uncredited)

Preservation status
The film survives today in the Library of Congress, albeit with some reported deterioration in the sixth and last reel.

References

External links

 
 
Lobby Poster for By Right of Purchase
Lantern slide (Wayback Machine)
Hedda Hopper in a scene in the film

1918 films
1918 drama films
Silent American drama films
American silent feature films
American black-and-white films
American independent films
Selznick Pictures films
1910s independent films
Films directed by Charles Miller
1910s American films